Latrobea is a genus of flowering plants in the legume family, Fabaceae. It belongs to the subfamily Faboideae. The plant is named after Charles Joseph La Trobe.

Species
Latrobea comprises the following species:
 Latrobea brunonis (Benth.) Meissner
 Latrobea diosmifolia (Benth.) Benth.
 Latrobea genistoides (Meissner) Meissner
 Latrobea hirtella (Turcz.) Benth.
 Latrobea tenella (Meissner) Benth.
 var. grandiflora Benth.
 var. tenella (Meissner) Benth.

Species names with uncertain taxonomic status
The status of the following species is unresolved:
 Latrobea colophona Chappill & C.F.Wilkins
 Latrobea pinnacula Chappill & C.F.Wilkins
 Latrobea pungens Benth.
 Latrobea recurva Chappill & C.F.Wilkins

References

Mirbelioids
Fabaceae genera